A mind-controlled wheelchair is a mind-machine interfacing device that uses thought (neural impulses) to command the motorised wheelchair's motion. The first such device to reach production was designed by Diwakar Vaish, Head of Robotics and Research at A-SET Training & Research Institutes. The wheelchair is of great importance to patients with locked-in syndrome (LIS), in which a patient is aware but cannot move or communicate verbally due to complete paralysis of nearly all voluntary muscles in the body except the eyes. Such wheelchairs can also be used in case of muscular dystrophy, a disease that weakens the musculoskeletal system and hampers locomotion (walking or moving).

History 
The technology behind brain or mind control goes back to at least 2002, when researchers implanted electrodes into the brains of macaque monkeys, which enabled them to control a cursor on a computer screen. Similar techniques were able to control robotic arms and simple joysticks. In 2009, researchers at the University of South Florida developed a wheelchair-mounted robotic arm that captured the user's brain waves and converted them into robotic movements. The Brain-Computer Interface (BCI), which captures P-300 brain wave responses and converts them to actions, was developed by USF psychology professor Emanuel Donchin and colleagues. The P-300 brain signal serves a virtual "finger" for patients who cannot move, such as those with locked-in syndrome or those with Lou Gehrig's Disease (ALS).

Technology

Operation 

A mind-controlled wheelchair functions using a brain–computer interface: an electroencephalogram (EEG) worn on the user's forehead detects neural impulses that reach the scalp allowing the micro-controller on board to detect the user's thought process, interpret it, and control the wheelchair's movement.

Functionality 

The A-SET wheelchair comes standard with many different types of sensors, like temperature sensors, sound sensors and an array of distance sensors which detect any unevenness in the surface. The chair automatically avoids stairs and steep inclines. It also has a "safety switch": in case of danger, the user can close his eyes quickly to trigger an emergency stop.

References 

https://web.archive.org/web/20160602134908/http://www.networkedindia.com/2016/03/18/the-worlds-first-mind-controlled-wheelchair/
https://web.archive.org/web/20160424100051/http://www.startupstalk.org/indian-develops-mind-controlled-wheelchair/

Neuroscience
Mobility devices
Robotics
Indian inventions
Electroencephalography
Muscular dystrophy